Elections to Liverpool City Council were held on 4 May 1978.  One third of the council was up for election and the John Hamilton of the Labour Party became Leader of the Council albeit without overall control.

After the election, the composition of the council was:

Election result

Ward results

* - Councillor seeking re-election

(PARTY) - Party of former Councillor

Abercromby, St. James

Aigburth

Allerton

Anfield

Arundel

Breckfield, St. Domingo

Broadgreen

Central, Everton, Netherfield

Childwall

Church

Clubmoor

County

Croxteth

Dingle

Dovecot

Fairfield

Fazakerley

Gillmoss

Granby, Prince's Park

Kensington

Low Hill, Smithdown

Melrose, Westminster

Old Swan

Picton

Pirrie

St. Mary's

St. Michael's

Sandhills, Vauxhall

Speke

Tuebrook

Warbreck

Woolton, East

Woolton, West

References

1978
Liverpool City Council election
City Council election, 1978
Liverpool City Council election